is a Japanese rower. He competed in the men's coxless pair event at the 1988 Summer Olympics.

References

External links
 

1965 births
Living people
Japanese male rowers
Olympic rowers of Japan
Rowers at the 1988 Summer Olympics
Place of birth missing (living people)